The Female Brain may refer to:

 The Female Brain (book), a 2006 book by Louann Brizendine
 The Female Brain (film), a 2017 comedy film